The current spouse of the Prime Minister of Croatia is  Ana Maslać.

Spouses of presidents 
(*) as spouse of the President of the Presidency of SR Croatia
(**) Spouses of Speakers of Parliament as Acting Presidents

Spouses of prime ministers 
(*) as spouse of the President of the Executive Council of SR Croatia

References

Croatia
Prime Ministers
List